Steeves (also Steves) is a surname. Notable people with the name include:

Burpee L. Steeves (1868–1933), American politician from Idaho; lieutenant governor of Idaho 1905–07
David Steeves (1934–1965), U.S. Air Force officer cleared of giving a jet to the USSR
George Steeves (born 1945), Canadian art photographer
Harold Steves Canadian politician and activist
Manoah Steves (1828-1897), founder of Steveston, British Columbia
Tim Steeves (contemporary), Canadian comedian and writer
Wayne Steeves (born 1944), Canadian politician from New Brunswick; provincial legislator
William Steeves (1814–1873), Canadian merchant and politician; one of the Fathers of Canadian Confederation

References

External links 
Steeves Museum